Sangrud (also Romanized as Sangrūd) is a village in Jirandeh Rural District, Amarlu District, Rudbar County, Gilan Province, Iran. At the 2006 census, its population was 298, in 77 families.

Sangrud (Norwegian surname) The surname Sangrud was given to inhabitants of the Sangrud farm (established before 1825) near Lesja, Oppland, Norway Many of the Sangrud, now Sangro, family still live in Norway, while others have come to the United States.

References 

Populated places in Rudbar County